Max Oliver Cogburn Jr. (born April 21, 1951) is a United States district judge of the United States District Court for the Western District of North Carolina.

Early life and education
Born in Cambridge, Massachusetts, Cogburn earned a Bachelor of Arts degree from the University of North Carolina in 1973 and a Juris Doctor from the Samford University Cumberland School of Law in 1976.

Professional career
From 1976 until 1980, Cogburn worked as an associate and then as a partner at an Asheville, North Carolina law firm. From 1980 until 1992, he worked in the United States Attorney's office in Asheville as an Assistant United States Attorney, including as Chief Assistant United States Attorney from 1986 until 1988. From 1992 until 1995, Cogburn was a partner in a law firm in Charlotte, North Carolina.  From 1995 until 2004, he served as a federal magistrate judge on the United States District Court for the Western District of North Carolina. He returned to private practice in 2004, working in Asheville, North Carolina.

Federal judicial service
On May 27, 2010, President Obama nominated Cogburn to a seat on the Western District of North Carolina. He was reported out of the Senate Judiciary Committee on December 8, 2010, but his nomination lapsed at the end of 2010 and the end of the 111th Congress. Obama renominated Cogburn on January 5, 2011, and he was reported out of the Senate Judiciary Committee on February 3, 2011. The Senate confirmed Cogburn by a 96–0 vote on March 10, 2011. He received his commission on March 11, 2011.

Notable rulings
On October 10, 2014, Cogburn struck down North Carolina's gay marriage ban as unconstitutional, opening the way for same-sex marriages in North Carolina to begin immediately.

Cogburn was a member of a three-judge panel that struck down the redistricting of certain North Carolina Congressional districts for relying too heavily on race. Cogburn also wrote a separate concurring opinion in that case. The case eventually made its way to the Supreme Court. The case, Cooper v. Harris, was upheld by a 5–3 decision of the Supreme Court on May 22, 2017.

References

External links

1951 births
Living people
Assistant United States Attorneys
Cumberland School of Law alumni
Judges of the United States District Court for the Western District of North Carolina
United States district court judges appointed by Barack Obama
21st-century American judges
University of North Carolina at Chapel Hill alumni
United States magistrate judges